William Sheppard may refer to:

 Bill Sheppard (footballer)  (1906–1950), English association footballer.
 Bill Sheppard (music producer), American R&B producer of the 1950s and 60s
 William Sheppard (barrister) (died 1674), English legal writer
 William Sheppard (painter) (fl. 1660s), English painter
 William Sheppard (trainer) (1855–1932), racehorse trainer in South Australia
 William Sheppard (baseball), American baseball player
 William Fleetwood Sheppard, Australian-British mathematician and statistician
 William Henry Sheppard, African-American Presbyterian missionary famous for revealing Belgian atrocities in the Congo Free State
 W. Morgan Sheppard (1932–2019), William Morgan Sheppard, British actor, sometimes credited as Morgan Sheppard
 William Bostwick Sheppard (1860–1934), U.S. federal judge

See also
William Shepard (disambiguation)
William Shepherd (disambiguation)